Sarah Francis Wiltshire (born 7 July 1991) is a professional footballer who plays for Cambridge United in the English FA Womens National League Division 1 South East and Wales as a midfielder or forward.

Career
Wiltshire made her first team debut for Arsenal as a 15-year old against Leeds, in April 2007.

On 12 July 2014, Wiltshire signed for fellow FA WSL 2 side Yeovil Town from Watford Ladies.

On 5 January 2015, Wiltshire left Yeovil Town to sign a professional contract with FA WSL 1 side Manchester City, having scored 10 goals in just 11 league games in her short time with Yeovil. Wiltshire only made one appearance for Manchester City before re-signing for Yeovil in June 2015.

In July 2016, Wiltshire announced that she was taking a temporary break from football, due to pregnancy. Wiltshire returned to Yeovil in April 2017 ahead of the FA WSL Spring Series.

On 11 July 2017, Wiltshire left Yeovil due to her inability to commit to traveling to training and subsequently she signed for newly promoted WSL 2 side Tottenham Hotspur. In her second season with the team, a second-place finish in the 2018–19 FA Women's Championship meant Spurs won promotion to the WSL. However, in July 2019, Wiltshire was one of 11 players released by the club ahead of their debut season as a top flight professional team.

Wiltshire subsequently returned for a third spell at Yeovil Town, playing in the FA Women's National League South. She signed for Cambridge United in August 2022.

References

External links
 

1991 births
Living people
Welsh women's footballers
Arsenal W.F.C. players
Watford F.C. Women players
Yeovil Town L.F.C. players
Cardiff City Ladies F.C. players
Manchester City W.F.C. players
Wales women's international footballers
Women's Super League players
FA Women's National League players
Women's association football midfielders
Women's association football forwards
Tottenham Hotspur F.C. Women players
English women's footballers
England women's youth international footballers